New Traditions in East Asian Bar Bands is an album by American composer and saxophonist/multi-instrumentalist John Zorn consisting of improvised music from paired instruments and narration in Chinese, Korean and Vietnamese. The pieces are listed individually within Zorn's game pieces and were composed in 1986, 1988 and 1990 respectively.

Reception
Stacia Proefrock of Allmusic stated, "This is one of John Zorn's greatest achievements to date.".

Track listing 
 "Hu Die" - 25:09 
 "Hwang Chin-Ee" - 16:41 
 "Que Tran" - 30:46

All music by John Zorn.
Text by Arto Lindsay (Track 1), Myung Mi Kim (Track 2), and Lyn Hejinian (Track 3).

Personnel 

On 'Hue Die'
 Bill Frisell: Guitar 
 Fred Frith: Guitar 
 Zhang Jinglin: Narrator

On 'Hwang Chin-Ee'
 Joey Baron: Drums 
 Samm Bennett: Drums
 Jung Hee Shin: Narrator
 
On 'Que Tran'
 Anthony Coleman: Keyboards 
 Wayne Horvitz: Keyboards; 
 Anh Tranc: Narrator

References 

1997 albums
Albums produced by John Zorn
John Zorn albums
Tzadik Records albums